Robert Garrigus (born November 11, 1977) is an American professional golfer who is currently a member of the PGA Tour. He won the 2010 Children's Miracle Network Classic, the last event of the PGA Tour season, to guarantee exempt status on the PGA Tour through the end of the 2012 season.

Garrigus is one of the longest drivers in the golfing world, with an average drive of 310.5 yards in 2007. He is one of the few players who can hit a ball over 350 yards. He led the PGA Tour in driving distance in both the 2009 and 2010 seasons with average distances of 312 and 315 yards, respectively. He is also noted for using a putter only 28.5 inches in length, about six inches shorter than a standard putter.  However in 2012, at the Humana Challenge, he gave up the shorter putter for a 46" putter.

Early years
Garrigus was born in Nampa, Idaho and spent most of his childhood in Banks, Oregon. He attended Forest Grove High School, Crescent Valley High School in Corvallis, Oregon and Centennial High School in Gresham, Oregon. In 1995, Garrigus finished first at the Valley League District Championships and later helped Crescent Valley High School to a 4A state championship by finishing T-9. Garrigus attended Scottsdale Community College later in 1995.

Professional career
Garrigus turned professional in 1997. He played on the NGA Hooters Tour and the Gateway Tour from 1997–1999. He played on the Buy.com Tour (now Web.com Tour) for the first time in 2000, and was also a member of the Nationwide Tour in 2002, 2004 and 2005. He finished tied for 9th in Q-School in 2005 to earn his PGA Tour card for the first time.

2010 season

Memphis collapse
At the 2010 St. Jude Classic in Memphis, Tennessee, Garrigus, playing in the final group, had a three-shot lead going into the 72nd hole, a long par four. He pulled his tee shot into the water hazard which flanks the hole's left side. After taking a penalty drop a long way back, he hit his third shot straight left, caught a tree left of the hazard and fell straight down. He punched out to the fairway and hit his fifth shot onto the green, within 35 feet of the hole. He two-putted from there, resulting in a triple bogey 7. A three-way sudden-death playoff with Lee Westwood and Robert Karlsson then began. On the first hole they played, the 18th, Garrigus's drive carried too far and came to rest against the trunk of a tree, right of the fairway. He chipped out and hit his third shot to 12 feet. His par putt lipped out and he made bogey. Karlsson and Westwood both made par, eliminating Garrigus, who finished tied for second place. The playoff was eventually won by Westwood, who birdied the fourth sudden-death hole.

Orlando victory
Needing a high finish to earn his tour card for 2011, he entered the final day 13 under par and  five shots behind the leader Roland Thatcher and one behind first-round leader Chris Stroud at the Children's Miracle Network Classic in suburban Orlando, Florida. Thatcher had reached 21-under in his third round, before a double bogey, bogey finish. After five birdies in his first seven holes, Garrigus caught Thatcher, who had parred his first seven holes.. Thatcher extended his lead with three birdies around the turn, before a bogey on twelve, as Garrigus in the group in front birdied thirteen, moving the pair level again. After Thatcher bogeyed sixteen, Garrigus held the solo lead in a tournament for the first time since Memphis. A further two-shot swing on the 17th, where Garrigus made birdie-3 to Thatcher's bogey-5, followed by a final-hole par, sealed his first professional win, by three strokes. With the victory, Garrigus earned an exemption on the PGA Tour through the end of the 2012 season. Prior to the tournament, Garrigus was 179th on the Tour, which would have meant a loss of his Tour card. Thatcher finished second.

On overcoming substance abuse
Immediately after finishing his final round in Orlando, Garrigus spoke openly in a television interview on the Golf Channel, about his triumph over substance abuse, his subsequent improved play, and his joy at closing out the season with a tournament victory, which made up for his struggles at the Memphis tournament earlier in the season.

In an article that appeared in Golf Digest in July 2011, Garrigus admitted that during the 2002 season, he and several other golfers on the Web.com Tour (then the Buy.com Tour) smoked marijuana during events:"Oh yeah, there were plenty of guys on the Nationwide Tour who smoked in the middle of the round. We always talked about it. You could go in the Porta John and take your drags."

In 2003, he entered a rehabilitation center near San Diego for a 45-day program. His newfound sobriety was almost immediately tested. Before entering rehab, he had left money for his roommate to keep the house and pay bills. The roommate instead used it for drugs and gambling; when Garrigus returned the night before he was to play in a sectional qualifier for the U.S. Open, he found the locks changed and the electricity disconnected. The roommate had left town to avoid gambling debts, leaving behind a substantial quantity of marijuana and a note reading, "Hope rehab was great. Have fun." As Garrigus would say,"I stood there for a minute, and then I grabbed the weed and threw it in the garbage. Then I took the refrigerator and threw it out with the chicken, everything. I called the electric company to get them to turn on the power. When I wake up the next morning, I didn't realize until I get to the golf course that my roommate had been using my putter. So I race back to the house at 140 miles per hour, get my putter, race back just in time for my tee time. I have no warm-up, no caddie, and my clubs are on a pull cart. I shoot 70 and miss by two shots. I told myself that wasn't too bad after 45 days without hitting a ball. I knew then I was going to be OK."

2011 season
In June 2011, Garrigus made his first ever cut in a major at the U.S. Open at Congressional Country Club, posting all four rounds under par on the way to a tied third place finish. This result ensured Garrigus of an invitation to the 2012 U.S. Open and the Masters. His 2011 season ended with over $1.5 million in earnings that included a playoff loss to Jonathan Byrd at the season-opening Hyundai Tournament of Champions.

Garrigus took part in the Long Drive Contest for charity at the Hyundai Tournament of Champions alongside Bubba Watson and Dustin Johnson and finished third with a longest drive of 365 yards.

2019 season
In March 2019, Garrigus was suspended by the PGA Tour for three months after testing positive for marijuana.

Personal life
Garrigus currently lives in Scottsdale, Arizona with his wife Ami, whom he met while in rehab, and a son born in September 2010.

His father, Thomas, won a silver medal in trap shooting at the 1968 Summer Olympics in Mexico City.

Professional wins (1)

PGA Tour wins (1)

PGA Tour playoff record (0–3)

Results in major championships

CUT = missed the half-way cut
WD = withdrew
"T" = tied

Summary

Most consecutive cuts made – 2 (2012 PGA – 2013 Masters)
Longest streak of top-10s – 1

Results in The Players Championship

CUT = missed the halfway cut
"T" indicates a tie for a place

Results in World Golf Championships

QF, R16, R32, R64 = Round in which player lost in match play
"T" = Tied

See also

2005 PGA Tour Qualifying School graduates
2006 PGA Tour Qualifying School graduates
2008 PGA Tour Qualifying School graduates
2015 Web.com Tour Finals graduates

References

External links

American male golfers
PGA Tour golfers
Korn Ferry Tour graduates
Doping cases in golf
Golfers from Idaho
Golfers from Scottsdale, Arizona
Scottsdale Community College alumni
People from Nampa, Idaho
People from Banks, Oregon
1977 births
Living people